Tetiz Municipality (Yucatec Maya: "place of the sweet potato") is one of the 106 municipalities in the Mexican state of Yucatán containing (180.11 km2) of land and is located roughly  west of the city of Mérida.

History
There is no accurate data on when the town was founded, but it was a settlement before the conquest and was located in the chieftainship of Ak Canul. After colonization, the area became part of the encomienda system with various encomenderos, including Pablo de Aguilar and Alonso Hernández between 1700 and 1750. 

Yucatán declared its independence from the Spanish Crown in 1821 and in 1825 the area was assigned to the Lower Camino Real under the  Hunucma Municipality. In 1918 the area was confirmed as its own municipality.

Governance
The municipal president is elected for a three-year term. The town council has four councilpersons, who serve as Secretary and councilors of heritage and public works; police and transit; public services, education and health; and parks, gardens and ecology.

Communities
The head of the municipality is Tetiz, Yucatán. The municipality has 10 other populated places including Homote, Kooté, Muxupilo, Nohuayum, San Antonio, San Antonio Viudas, San Francisco, Toxix and Yulca. The significant populations are shown below:

Local festivals
Every year from 10 to 15 August the town holds a festival in honor of our Lady of the Asunción.

Tourist attractions
 Church of San Bernardino, built in the colonial era 
 Hacienda Nohuayún
 Hacienda Santa Cecilia

References

Municipalities of Yucatán